Paul K. Cousino Senior High School is a public secondary school located in Warren, Michigan.  It lies on Hoover Road, just south of 13 Mile Road.  Part of the Warren Consolidated Schools district, it serves the north Warren area and parts of southern Sterling Heights.

Cousino High School opened in 1962.  It is one of three high schools in the Warren Consolidated Schools (WCS) district. The current principal is Andre Buford.

Athletic programs
Competitive Cheer-Varsity, JV
Dance-Varsity, JV
Baseball - Varsity, JV
Basketball - Varsity, JV, Freshman
Bowling-Varsity, JV
Football - Varsity, JV, Freshmen 
Golf-Boys Varsity 
Hockey - Varsity
Lacrosse - Varsity
Tennis-Varsity, JV
Track and field-Varsity, JV
Sideline Cheer-Varsity, JV
Soccer - Varsity, JV
Softball - Varsity, JV
Swimming-Varsity 
Volleyball - Varsity, JV, Freshmen 
Wrestling - Varsity, JV

Technological capabilities
Paul K. Cousino Senior High School is home to the only school-owned radio station in Warren and Sterling Heights, 89.1 WPHS-FM. Cousino also hosts an amateur television studio, WCS-TV, which broadcasts its works on various channels throughout Warren and Sterling Heights, depending on cable providers. The channel is no longer used for regular broadcasts and is now used for events only. However, the production studio is still used, and productions are posted to YouTube instead.

References

External links

 Cousino High School website
 Warren Consolidated Schools website

Educational institutions established in 1962
Public high schools in Michigan
Schools in Macomb County, Michigan
1962 establishments in Michigan